Niall Rowe (born 2003) is an Irish hurler. At club level he plays with Dicksboro and at inter-county level with the Kilkenny senior hurling team.

Career

Rowe first played hurling at juvenile and underage levels with the Dicksboro club, while also playing as a schoolboy with CBS Kilkenny. He won consecutive Kilkenny MHC titles with Dicksboro in 2019 and as team captain in 2020.

Rowe first appeared on the inter-county scene as a member of the Kilkenny minor hurling team that lost the 2020 All-Ireland minor final to Galway. He subsequently progressed to the under-20 team and was at right corner-back when Kilkenny beat Limerick in the 2022 All-Ireland under-20 final.

Rowe first played for the senior team during the 2023 Walsh Cup.

Honours

Kilkenny
All-Ireland Under-20 Hurling Championship: 2022
Leinster Under-20 Hurling Championship: 2022
Leinster Minor Hurling Championship: 2020

References

2003 births
Living people
Dicksboro hurlers
Kilkenny inter-county hurlers